Josemans v Burgemeester van Maastricht (case C-137/09) is a European Union law case from 2010, concerning cannabis and the free movement of services in the European Union. The Second Chamber of the Court of Justice of the European Union pronounced its ruling on 16 December 2010.

Facts
Netherlands prohibited marketing of marijuana, but tolerated by law. Municipal legislation in Maastricht limited access to marijuana cafes to residents only. Josemans, who ran a coffee shop selling marijuana, claimed that this prohibition contravened the freedom to provide services under TFEU article 56, and that it would have to be justified.

Judgment
The Court of Justice, Second Chamber, held that TFEU article 56 could not be relied on to challenge municipal laws. Legislation restricting free movement of services was justified by the need to combat drug tourism.

Significance
The case has been criticised for its inconsistency on previous Court of Justice cases on illegal services. For example, De Witte writes the following.

See also

European Union law

References

2010 in cannabis
2010 in case law
2010 in the Netherlands
Cannabis in Europe
Cannabis in the Netherlands
Drug policy
European Union services case law
History of Maastricht
Maastricht
Recreational drug tourism